William Churchill may refer to:
 William Churchill (burgess)(1649–1710) British attorney who became merchant, burgess and planter in the Virginia colony
 William Churchill (Dorchester MP) (1627–1702), MP for Dorchester 1685–1689
 William Churchill (Ipswich MP) (1661–1737), MP for Ipswich 1707–1714 and 1715–1717
 William Churchill (ethnologist) (1859–1920), American Polynesian ethnologist and philologist
 William Churchill (athlete) (1885–1969), American long-distance runner
 Bill Churchill (1904–1959), Australian rules footballer
 William Algernon Churchill (1865–1947), art historian and British diplomat
 William Nosworthy Churchill (1796–1846), British-born journalist in Turkey
 William Sydney Churchill (1860–1918), British military officer